VK Agel Prostějov is a Czech women's volleyball club based in Prostějov.

Previous names
Due to sponsorship, the club have competed under the following names:
 VK Prostějov (2007–2009)
 VK Modranská Prostějov (2009–2012)
 VK Agel Prostějov (2012–present)

History
The club was founded in 2007, when TK Plus decided to create a top class women's volleyball team in Prostějov. The club plays its home matches at the 2,200 capacity Sportcentrum DDM.

Honours

National competitions
  Czech Championship: 9
2008–09, 2009–10, 2010–11, 2011–12, 2012–13, 2013–14, 2014–15, 2015–16, 2016–17

  Czech Cup: 9
2007–08, 2008–09, 2009–10, 2010–11, 2011–12, 2012–13, 2013–14, 2014–15, 2015–16

International competitions
  MEVZA Cup: 1
2010–11

Team
Season 2017–2018, as of December 2017.

References

External links

Prostějov official website
CEV profile

Czech volleyball clubs
Sport in Prostějov
Volleyball clubs established in 2007
2007 establishments in the Czech Republic